The Pengshui Dam is an arch dam on the Wu River in Wulong County, Chongqing, China. The dam provides water to a 1,750 MW hydroelectric power station containing 5 x 350 MW generators. Construction on the dam began in September 2003 and the power plant was operational in 2008.

See also 

 List of dams and reservoirs in China
 List of power stations in China

References

Hydroelectric power stations in Chongqing
Dams in China
Arch dams
Dams completed in 2008
Dams on the Wu River
Energy infrastructure completed in 2009